
Paradise Park may refer to the following places:

Shopping mall in Thailand 
 Paradise Park (mall) in eastern Bangkok

Wildlife parks in the United Kingdom 
Paradise Park, Cornwall - located in Hayle
Paradise Park, London - located in the Borough of Islington
Paradise Park, Newhaven - located in Newhaven, East Sussex
Paradise Wildlife Park - located in Broxbourne, Hertfordshire

United States 
Paradise Park, California
Paradise Park, California, alternate name of El Campo, California
Paradise Park, Florida, a segregation-era tourist attraction
Paradise Park, Georgia
Paradise Park, a former theme park adjacent to Lyon Arboretum, Hawaii
Hawaiian Paradise Park, Hawaii
Paradise Park, Missouri
Paradise Park (amusement park), New York, defunct
Paradise Park in Windsor, Vermont including Runnemede Lake
Paradise Park Historic District in Thomasville, Georgia
Paradise Park Natural Area, a protected area of Rocky Mountain National Park in Colorado